One for the Road may refer to:

Literature
 "One for the Road" (short story), a short story by Stephen King
 One for the Road (Bjørn Christian Tørrissen book), a travel book
 One for the Road (Pinter play)
 One for the Road (Russell play)
 One for the Road, a book by Tony Horwitz
 One for the Road, a mystery novel by Fredric Brown

Music

Albums
 One for the Road (April Wine album)
 One for the Road (Devin The Dude album)
 One for the Road (The Kinks album)
 One for the Road (Ocean Colour Scene album)
 One for the Road (Ronnie Lane album)
 One for the Road (Willie Nelson and Leon Russell album)
 One for the Road, an album by Culann's Hounds
 One for the Road, an album by Ray Stevens

Songs
 "One for the Road" (song), a song by Arctic Monkeys
 "One for the Road", a song by Bexta
 "One for the Road", a song by House of Pain from House of Pain
 "One for the Road", a song by Judas Priest from Rocka Rolla
 "One for the Road", a song by Ocean Colour Scene from Moseley Shoals 
 "One for the Road", a song by Bob Dylan
 "One for the Road", a song in the video game Guitar Hero II by the Breaking Wheel

Film and television
 One for the Road (2003 film), a British comedy-drama starring Hywel Bennett
 One for the Road (2009 film) (Le dernier pour la route), a French film by Philippe Godeau
 One for the Road (2014 film), a Mexican film
 One for the Road (2021 film), a Thai drama film
 Blue Collar Comedy Tour: One for the Road, a 2006 television film and CD album
 Glenn Tilbrook: One for the Road, a 2004 documentary
 One for the Road, a British spoof-travel television show starring Alan Davies

Television episodes
 "One for the Road" (Alfred Hitchcock Presents)
 "One for the Road" (Amazing Stories)
 "One for the Road" (All Saints, season 3)
 "One for the Road" (All Saints, season 9)
 "One for the Road" (The Bill)
 "One for the Road" (Blue Heelers)
 "One for the Road" (Cheers)
 "One for the Road" (Chelmsford 123)
 "One for the Road" (ER)
 "One for the Road" (Gunsmoke)
 "One for the Road" (Harry O)
 "One for the Road" (Hey Dad..!)
 "One for the Road" (Iznogoud)
 "One for the Road" (Just Deal)
 "One for the Road" (Major Dad)
 "One for the Road" (Man About the House)
 "One for the Road" (Party of Five)
 "One for the Road" (Roseanne)
 "One for the Road" (Safe Harbor)
 "One for the Road" (Starman)
 "One for the Road" (Surfside 6)
 "One for the Road" (Whatever Happened to the Likely Lads?)
 "One for the Road" (Within These Walls)
 "One for the Road" (Yu-Gi-Oh!)
 "One for the Road", an episode of Target: The Corruptors!
 "One for the Road", an episode of The Web

See also
 "One for My Baby (and One More for the Road)", a song written by Harold Arlen and Johnny Mercer, popularized by Frank Sinatra
 One More for the Road, a short-story collection by Ray Bradbury
 One More for the Road, a 2017 album by Curtis Stigers
 One More from the Road, an album by Lynyrd Skynyrd